Dust is a 2009 film by Luxembourgish director Max Jacoby.

Plot
Since most of the human race has disappeared from the face of the earth, Elodie and Elias are living by themselves in an isolated mansion in the countryside. Their peaceful existence risks coming to an end however when they discover an injured boy named Gabriel.

References

External links
 
 Review Le Jeudi
 Filmsprung
 Land

2009 films
Austrian drama films
Luxembourgian drama films
English-language Austrian films
English-language Luxembourgian films
2009 drama films
2000s English-language films
English-language drama films